Stuart Kelly is a Scottish critic and author. He is the literary editor of The Scotsman.

His works include The Book Of Lost Books: An Incomplete Guide To All The Books You’ll Never Read (2005), Scott-Land: The Man Who Invented A Nation (2010) (which was longlisted for the BBC Samuel Johnson Prize for Non-Fiction) and The Minister and the Murderer (2018).
Kelly writes for The Scotsman, Scotland On Sunday, The Guardian and The Times. 
In 2013 Kelly was a judge for the Man Booker Prize.  In 2016/17 Kelly was president of The  Edinburgh Sir Walter Scott Club.

Bibliography
 The Book of Lost Books (2005)
 Scott-land: The Man Who Invented a Nation (2011)
 The Minister and the Murderer (2018)

References

External links
 Susan Haigh, "An interview with Stuart Kelly", Dundee Review of the Arts, 2014-02-24.

Living people
Alumni of the University of Oxford
Scottish literary critics
Scottish male writers
Year of birth missing (living people)